The 2013–14 W-League season was the sixth season of the W-League, the Australian national women's association football competition. The season consisted of twelve matchdays followed by a finals series. The regular season started on 9 November 2013 and concluded on 9 February 2014. The Grand Final took place on 23 February 2014. 

Canberra United won the regular season, winning the Premier title. Melbourne Victory won the play-offs for the overall championship title. Melbourne's Jessica Fishlock was named W-League player of the season by Australian media.

Clubs
W-League teams for the 2013–14 season:

Personnel and kits

Foreign players

The following do not fill a Visa position:
A Australian citizens who have chosen to represent another national team;
B Those players who were born and started their professional career abroad but have since gained Australian citizenship;
G Guest Players

Regular season

League table

Fixtures
Individual matches are collated at each club's season article.

Finals series

Semi-finals

Grand final

Season statistics

Leading goalscorers
Updated to after game 9 February 2014.

Own goals

International Competition

The W-League was represented in the second edition of the International Women's Club Championship, known for sponsorship reasons as the Mobcast Cup.

Sydney FC (the winners of the 2012–13 season) participated in the tournament, which took place from 30 November until 8 December 2013, and finished in third place (out of 5 teams).

See also

 2013–14 Adelaide United W-League season
 2013–14 Brisbane Roar W-League season
 2013–14 Canberra United W-League season
 2013–14 Melbourne Victory W-League season
 2013–14 Newcastle Jets W-League season
 2013–14 Perth Glory W-League season
 2013–14 Sydney FC W-League season
 2013–14 Western Sydney Wanderers W-League season

Notes

References

 
Australia
1
A-League Women seasons